"Psycho Circus" is a song by the American hard rock band Kiss. It is the title track from the 1998 album Psycho Circus. The single charted highly, hitting number 1 on Billboard Hot Mainstream Rock Tracks chart. Even though MTV hardly played the song's music video, the VHS home video proved a big seller, eventually going Platinum in the US.

Song information
"Psycho Circus" was written by guitarist/vocalist Paul Stanley and Curt Cuomo specifically to fit the theme of the Psycho Circus Tour and album. According to producer Bruce Fairbairn, "We didn't have an opener for the record. We didn't have anything that was going to start things off. And [Paul] just looked at me and said, 'check this. This is it...' We both sat there and looked at each other and started to laugh. Because that was it" 

As a single, the song became the band's first number one hit on the Billboard Hot Mainstream Rock Tracks chart, while also proving to be a Top Ten hit in other countries in the world, including Sweden, Canada and Norway.

The song would open sets for the band on the Psycho Circus Tour to support the album, and was performed on Kiss's live album Kiss Symphony: Alive IV in 2003. "Psycho Circus" returned to setlist during the 2010s, on both the Monster World Tour and The KISS 40th Anniversary World Tour.

"Psycho Circus" was nominated for a Grammy Award in 1999 for Best Hard Rock Performance, losing out to Jimmy Page and Robert Plant's "Most High".

Video
A music video was made to promote the single, which was made in the same 3-D theme as the album and tour, and was directed by James J. Hurlburt and produced by Doc McGhee and Eddie Vasker. Although the video was generally ignored by MTV, it won a 1998 Metal Edge Readers' Choice Award for Video of the Year.

To compensate for the lack of MTV airplay the band released the video on VHS complete with 3-D glasses. In addition to "Psycho Circus" the included CD single features Ace Frehley's "In Your Face", a song not available elsewhere in North America.

The video was certified Platinum in the US.

Charts

Personnel
Paul Stanley - lead vocals, rhythm guitar
Tommy Thayer - lead guitar
Bruce Kulick - bass guitar, backing vocals
Kevin Valentine - drums

References

Kiss (band) songs
1998 singles
Songs written by Paul Stanley
Songs written by Curtis Cuomo
Song recordings produced by Bruce Fairbairn
Mercury Records singles
PolyGram singles